Srividya (24 July 1953 – 19 October 2006), was an Indian actress best known for her work predominantly in Malayalam and Tamil films, along with few Telugu, Kannada and Hindi films. In a career spanning for 40 years, she had acted in more than 800 films. In the latter part of her career, she concentrated on Malayalam films.

List

Malayalam

Tamil

Telugu

Hindi

Kannada

Singer

References 

Indian filmographies
Actress filmographies